Minar Rahman, popularly known as Minar, is an independent Bangladeshi singer-songwriter, composer, lyricist, writer and cartoonist. He rose to fame with the first released song "Shada Ronger Shopnogulo", which was a hit in 2008. Minar does write lyrics and compose songs from his childhood and has developed his own musical style. He has released his first solo album in 2008 named 'Danpitey' which is written, composed and sung by himself. He published his first novel 'Rudro Ebong Ekti Grand Piano' in Ekushey Boimela 2019.

Minar came up with his second studio album, 'Aari' in 2011 after collaborating in mixed albums. His third album, 'Ahare' released in 2015, One more album Deyale Deyale released in 2016. His Song 'Jhoom' has currently more than 60 million YouTube views which is also written, composed and sung by himself. 

In 2018, Minar made his debut in Tollywood, with the single, "Eka Din" for a Bengali film Fidaa.

Minar has completed his SSC from Chittagong Government high school. Later he did his 'A' Level. Then he has completed his Undergaraduate Degree in Masscommunication from American International University-Bangladesh (AIUB). He has received very prestigious 'Dr. Anwarul Abedin Leadership Award' in the 20th Convocation of American International University-Bangladesh (AIUB). He joined one of the most popular satire magazines of Bangladesh named Unmad as a cartoonist in the year of 2008.

Personal life 
Minar was born on 26 December. His father is Late Mohammad Azharul Islam and his mother is Nilufar Islam. He is the youngest son of his family..

Career 

Minar started his musical life by the inspiration of his father. His father was a banker. In childhood, he wrote his first poem. In class eight, he learned playing keyboard. As a student of class ten, he started writing lyrics and composing.  He thought that, the lyric is the major part of a song. Minar became famous after releasing his song "Shada", which was written, composed and sung by Minar and music was arranged by Tahsan. His first solo album "Danpitey" released in 2008, second solo album "Aari" got released in 2011. His third solo album is  "Aha Re", which was released on 6 June 2015. In 2013 he worked on a mixed album named "The Hit Album 4". Minar also worked for some Teleflims, Bengali Cinemas etc.

Discography

Studio albums

EPs

Compilation albums

Singles

Guest appearances

Soundtracks 
{| class="wikitable"
|+
!Year
!Film
!Song
!Composer
!Label
!Notes
!Reference
|-
|2018
|Fidaa
|"Eka Din"
|Arindam Chatterjee
|SVF Music
|Indian Bengali film
|
}

References

Living people
Date of birth missing (living people)
21st-century Bangladeshi male singers
21st-century Bangladeshi singers
Bangladeshi composers
Bangladeshi male television actors
Bangladeshi cartoonists
1992 births
American International University-Bangladesh alumni